Chrysopetra (meaning "golden rock") is a village and a community south of the city of Kilkis in the Kilkis regional unit, Greece. Chrysopetra is part of the municipal unit Gallikos and has a population of 113 people (2011). The community Chrysopetra (pop. 708 in 2011) consists of the villages Chrysopetra, Fanari, Laodikino, Peristeri and Pyrgotos.

References 

Populated places in Kilkis (regional unit)